Eigia is a monotypic genus of flowering plants belonging to the family Brassicaceae. It only contains 1 species, Eigia longistyla (Eig) Soják .

Its native range is eastern Mediterranean, and is found in the countries of Palestine and Saudi Arabia.

Its genus name of Eigia is in honour of Alexander Eig (1894–1938) an Israeli botanist, and the epithet of longistyla is a combination of 'long' and the Greek word of stylos meaning a pillar. 

Eigia longistyla (Eig) Soják  was first published and described in Cas. Nár. Mus., Odd. Prír Vol.148 on page 193 (in 1979 but published in 1980).

References

Brassicaceae
Brassicaceae genera
Plants described in 1980
Flora of Palestine (region)
Flora of Saudi Arabia